The 2012 Royal Rumble was the 25th annual Royal Rumble professional wrestling pay-per-view (PPV) event produced by WWE. It took place on January 29, 2012, at the Scottrade Center in St. Louis, Missouri. As has been customary since 1993, the Royal Rumble match winner received a world championship match at that year's WrestleMania. For the 2012 event, the winner received their choice to challenge for either the WWE Championship or World Heavyweight Championship at WrestleMania XXVIII. It was the first Royal Rumble held since the end of the first brand extension in August 2011.

Six professional wrestling matches were featured at the event. The main event was the 2012 Royal Rumble match. Sheamus - the 22nd entrant - won the match by last eliminating Chris Jericho, the 29th entrant. Two title matches were featured: a WWE Championship match with CM Punk defending against Dolph Ziggler, which Punk won to retain the title, and a Triple Threat Steel Cage match for the World Heavyweight Championship between the reigning champion Daniel Bryan, Big Show, and Mark Henry, which Bryan won to retain the championship. Incidentally, this event is also noted as Mick Foley's last night as an active wrestler as he would compete in the Royal Rumble match.

The event received 443,000 pay-per-view buys, slightly down from 446,000 buys the previous year's event received.

Production

Background
The Royal Rumble is an annual gimmick pay-per-view (PPV), produced every January by WWE since 1988—in April 2011, the promotion ceased going by its full name of World Wrestling Entertainment, with "WWE" becoming an orphaned initialism. It is one of the promotion's original four pay-per-views, along with WrestleMania, SummerSlam, and Survivor Series, dubbed the "Big Four". It is named after the Royal Rumble match, a modified battle royal in which the participants enter at timed intervals instead of all beginning in the ring at the same time. The 2012 event was the 25th event in the Royal Rumble chronology and was scheduled to be held on January 29, 2012, at the Scottrade Center in St. Louis, Missouri. It was the first Royal Rumble held since the end of the first brand split in August 2011.

The Royal Rumble match generally features 30 wrestlers. The 2011 event broke tradition and had 40 participants, but 2012 returned to 30. The winner of the match traditionally earns a world championship match at that year's WrestleMania. For 2012, the winner could choose to challenge for either the WWE Championship or World Heavyweight Championship at WrestleMania XXVIII.

Storylines 
The card consisted of five matches, including one on the pre-show. The matches resulted from scripted storylines, where wrestlers portrayed heroes, villains, or less distinguishable characters to build tension and culminated in a wrestling match or series of matches. Results were predetermined by WWE's writers, with storylines produced on their weekly television shows, Raw and SmackDown.

A highly promoted match featured CM Punk defending his WWE Championship against Dolph Ziggler. On the December 26, 2011 episode of Raw, Punk was put into a gauntlet match by Interim Raw General Manager John Laurinaitis, with the stipulation that if either one of Jack Swagger, Ziggler, or Mark Henry defeated Punk, they would receive a championship match against the latter the next week. Ziggler won the match after Punk was distracted by Laurinaitis throwing out Vickie Guerrero and Swagger from ringside. The next week, during the title match, Punk was counted out as a result of another intervention from Laurinaitis. However, since titles cannot change hands via countout, Punk retained the championship. After the match, Laurinaitis announced that Punk would defend his championship against Ziggler in a rematch at the Royal Rumble, with himself acting as the special guest referee. Then on the January 9, 2012 edition of Raw, when Punk faced Swagger in a singles match, Laurinaitis added a stipulation that if Swagger lost, he and Vickie Guerrero would be banned from ringside at the pay-per-view; Punk won the match, and thus, Guerrero and Swagger are banned from ringside during the championship match. Additionally, a week later on the January 16 episode of Raw, in a segment with Mick Foley, Laurinaitis revealed that he was using this opportunity to cost Punk his title for disrespecting him.

Another match heading into the Royal Rumble featured John Cena against Kane. Upon returning to the WWE on the December 12 edition of Raw, after an absence of nearly four months, Kane interrupted Cena's match against Mark Henry, and though it was Henry who put him out of action, he bypassed him and attacked Cena, chokeslamming him before revealing his new mask. While demanding an explanation for these events the next week on Raw, Cena was again attacked by Kane, who revealed in the next several weeks of his desire to have Cena "embrace the hate" (his current on-screen character and T-shirt promoting otherwise) within caused by the anti-Cena crowd who continued to boo him. When Cena dismissed any intentions of doing so, Kane not only continued his attacks on Cena, but began to direct his attention to his close friend Zack Ryder, assaulting him as well, to the point of injuring him (kayfabe), ultimately leading to Ryder losing his United States Championship to Jack Swagger on the January 16, 2012 episode of Raw, under orders from John Laurinaitis. The same night, Laurinaitis put Cena in a one-on-one match against Kane at the Royal Rumble, in addition to booking Cena in a match against Swagger. Before the match even officially started, Cena started to attack Swagger aggressively to avenge Ryder's loss, prompting Kane to appear on the TitanTron and congratulate him to have started "embracing his hate". On the January 23 episode of Raw, during a Falls Count Anywhere match (in which Laurinaitis had prevented Cena from interfering, on the pretext of never granting Ryder a rematch for the United States Championship if he did so), Kane chokeslammed Ryder through the entrance stage, incapacitating him. As Ryder was stretchered and taken away in an ambulance, Eve Torres (Ryder's storyline girlfriend) blamed Cena for Ryder's injuries, leading to Cena knocking the microphone out of interviewer Josh Mathews' hand in frustration, and donning a very aggressive look in response to this entire situation.

Another featured bout involved Daniel Bryan defending his World Heavyweight Championship in a Triple
Threat Steel Cage match against Big Show and Mark Henry. In December 2011, at TLC: Tables, Ladders and Chairs, after Big Show defeated Henry in a Chairs match to win the World Heavyweight Championship for the first time, Bryan immediately cashed in his Money in the Bank contract to defeat Big Show, after a post-match attack on the latter by Henry. Using his rematch clause, Big Show faced off against Bryan on SmackDown, only for the champion to agitate Henry at ringside, who pushed Bryan, thus retaining his title. The following week on SmackDown, Bryan defended his title against Big Show again, this time in a No Disqualification, No Count-Out match, which ended in a no contest, when Big Show accidentally ran into and injured Bryan's storyline girlfriend, AJ. The next week on SmackDown, Henry finally enacted his rematch clause against Bryan in a lumberjack match; however, that match also ended up as a no contest, when the lumberjacks became too hostile because of how Bryan had agitated them, and the post-match scenario erupted into a large brawl involving nearly everyone. This forced SmackDown'''s General Manager Theodore Long to officially book Bryan, Big Show and Henry in a Triple Threat Steel Cage match for the World Heavyweight Championship at the Royal Rumble.

Event

In a dark match prior to the PPV broadcast, Yoshi Tatsu defeated Heath Slater.

 Preliminary matches
The actual pay-per-view opened with a Triple Threat Steel Cage match with Daniel Bryan defending his World Heavyweight Championship against Mark Henry and Big Show. Bryan retained by escaping the cage after he fell from Big Show's grasp (Bryan was climbing out of the cage, and Show was trying to pull him back in over the top) and fell to the arena floor.

The next match was an Eight-Diva tag team match with Alicia Fox, Eve Torres, Kelly Kelly and Tamina Snuka taking on The Bella Twins (Nikki and Brie Bella) and The Divas of Doom (Divas Champion Beth Phoenix and Natalya). The latter team won after Phoenix tagged herself in and performed a glam slam on Kelly Kelly, scoring the pinfall.

The following match was between John Cena and Kane.  After a back and forth contest, the action would spill from the ring, and the match ended in a double count-out.  After the match, Kane would continue his assault, hitting Cena with multiple chair shots before attacking an injured Zack Ryder, who was watching the event from a private office.  Kane dragged Ryder to the ring and performed a Tombstone Piledriver on him. Cena then reentered the ring and tried to retaliate, but Kane chokeslammed him.

The next match was made after Drew McIntyre requested a spot in the Royal Rumble, asking Smackdown GM Teddy Long for an opportunity to prove himself, so he gave him a match against a mystery opponent who turned out to be Brodus Clay. Despite McIntyre starting the match well, Clay would quickly defeat him after a running splash.

The penultimate match of the card was the WWE Championship match between reigning champion CM Punk and Dolph Ziggler with Raw interim GM John Laurinaitis serving as outside enforcer. As per the match stipulations, Ziggler's tag team partner Jack Swagger and manager Vickie Guerrero were both banned from ringside. The first part of the match was a hold-for-hold encounter.  Towards the latter part of the match Punk had Ziggler beaten, but the referee was knocked out and unable to make the count. Punk would execute a second GTS and both the referee and enforcer Laurinaitis counted to three and Punk retained his championship.

Main event

The main event was the annual Royal Rumble match, where the winner would get a world championship match of their choice at Wrestlemania XXVIII. As a result of losing a match to R-Truth on Raw'', The Miz entered at #1, and started the match with Alex Riley. Miz quickly eliminated Riley and was then joined by entrant #3, R-Truth, before Intercontinental Champion Cody Rhodes entered at #4. Miz eliminated R-Truth, who then pulled Miz under the bottom rope and layed him out on the outside. Mick Foley, the first surprise entrant of the match, entered at #7 and immediately eliminated one half of the Tag Team Champions Primo (#6). Ricardo Rodriguez then entered at #8 and teamed up with Foley to eliminate Justin Gabriel (#5). Santino Marella entered at #9 and eliminated Ricardo before squaring off with Foley. Marella brought out his Cobra puppet while Foley brought out Mr. Socko. The two then teamed up to eliminate entrant #10 Epico, the other half of the Tag Team Champions. Marella and Foley locked Cobra and Mr. Socko together, only for Rhodes to intervene and eliminate Marella before eliminating Foley as well. Hall of Famer Jerry "The King" Lawler, who was sitting on commentary, entered at #12 as a surprise entrant and performed a diving elbow drop on Miz but was quickly eliminated by Rhodes immediately afterwards.

The ring began to fill up with superstars as Booker T, who was also sitting on commentary, entered at #17 and Hall of Famer and first ever winner "Hacksaw" Jim Duggan entered at #19, the latter of whom was quickly eliminated by Rhodes. Miz almost eliminated Kofi Kingston (#11) by causing him to almost fall off the apron. When Miz tried to flip Kingston over by his legs, Kingston instead did a handstand and walked over to the steps without his feet touching the floor, saving himself and staying in the match. Rhodes and Dolph Ziggler (#18) teamed up to eliminate Booker T and The Great Khali (#15). Michael Cole, the final member of the commentary team, entered at #20, only to be joined by entrant #21, Kharma, the third female superstar to ever enter a rumble match. Cole climbed over the top rope to avoid Kharma, only for Lawler and Booker T to pull Cole to the floor, eliminating him. Kharma then eliminated Hunico (#16), but was then eliminated by Ziggler. Another surprise entrant, Road Dogg, entered at #23, before United States Champion Jack Swagger joined the match at #25. Wade Barrett (#26) eliminated Road Dogg only to be joined by 2009 winner Randy Orton (#28), who in turn eliminated him. Chris Jericho came out at #29, eliminating David Otunga (#27), before Big Show entered at #30. As Big Show entered, he assisted Sheamus (#22) in eliminating Swagger before hitting Swagger with a knockout punch. Big Show cleared out the ring, eliminating both Miz (who lasted over 45 minutes) and Rhodes (who lasted over 41 minutes and scored the most eliminations with six) at the same time, as well as Ziggler.

This brought the final four down to Sheamus, Orton, Jericho and Big Show. The former three teamed up on Big Show, who fought them off, executing a chokeslam on Jericho only to be hit with an RKO from Orton. Sheamus and Orton then attempted to eliminate Big Show. Big Show pushed Sheamus away but Orton tipped Big Show over the top rope to eliminate him. Immediately afterwards, Jericho quickly eliminated Orton from behind to put himself in the final two with Sheamus.

Sheamus and Jericho went back-and-forth as Sheamus countered a running bulldog from Jericho to almost eliminate him, but Jericho fought out of it and hit Sheamus with a dropkick. Sheamus hit Jericho with the Irish Curse backbreaker and set up the High Cross to try and eliminate him. Jericho slipped out and clotheslined Sheamus over the top rope, who held on, before Jericho hit another dropkick to try and eliminate Sheamus, who still managed to hold on. Sheamus fought back into the ring, hitting a flying shoulder tackle on Jericho before attempting a Brogue Kick. Jericho countered and locked Sheamus in the Walls of Jericho. Jericho tried to clothesline Sheamus over the top rope, but Sheamus countered and flipped Jericho over the top rope onto the apron, who held on just enough to stop his feet touching the floor. The two superstars made their way onto the top turnbuckle, where both fell off but avoided elimination. Jericho caught Sheamus with a Codebreaker and attempted to tip him over the top rope, but Sheamus fought out of it and pushed Jericho away. Jericho ducked a Brogue Kick attempt from Sheamus and attempted a second Codebreaker but Sheamus countered by catching Jericho and threw him over the top rope onto the apron. Jericho again avoided touching the floor, but as he brought himself back up, Sheamus hit him with a Brogue Kick, which knocked Jericho off the apron to finally eliminate him after a 7-minute clash, meaning Sheamus won the Royal Rumble match.

Reception
The event received mixed reviews. The Canadian Online Explorer gave Royal Rumble a 6.5 out of 10, with the Royal Rumble match receiving the same rating. The World Heavyweight Championship match and the John Cena vs. Kane match were rated a 5 out of 10 and the Divas' tag-team match a 3 out of 10. The WWE Championship match received the highest rating with an 8.5 out of 10.

Results

Royal Rumble entrances and eliminations
 – Winner

References

External links
Official website

Events in St. Louis
2012
2012 in Missouri
Professional wrestling in St. Louis
2012 WWE pay-per-view events
January 2012 events in the United States